Enchanted Hills is an unincorporated community in Napa County, California. It lies at an elevation of 1073 feet (327 m).

Enchanted Hills is a campground and retreat center for children and adults with visual impairments. It was founded in 1950 by Rose Resnick. It is owned and operated by LightHouse for the Blind and Visually Impaired.

References

Unincorporated communities in California
Unincorporated communities in Napa County, California